A ulonic acid is a carboxylic acid derived from a monosaccharide where the acid group is at position 1.

References

Carboxylic acids